Al Jewer is a Native American flutist originally from Detroit, Michigan.  He has worked as a record producer and engineer, and as a studio musician, but he has become well known internationally for his work on the Native American flute.  His early musical training was with the concert flute, and he has been performing classical music with that instrument since the early 1980s.  In 1984, he established Laughing Cat Studio, and in 1994, Laughing Cat Records to give himself control over the recording, production and distribution of his music.  This has given him the chance to work with many other musicians of the Midwestern United States, including Blackhawk, David Storei and Roxanne Neat, Natty Nation, Adrian Belew and Weekend Wages.  Laughing Cat Records currently features artists who perform in Ambient, Native American, Reggae, Classical and Folk.  Al has released two solo albums: River Crossing and Prairie Plain Song as well as Two Trees and Music of the Earth (with Andy Mitran).  He also previously formed a duo with Christine Ibach called Cedar Wind.  Cedar Wind released two albums, Feather on the Wind and Kindred Spirits.  His recent music often features harmonies on the alto and bass flute with melodies on the Native American flute.

In 2000, he started working with co-composer Andy Mitran (best known as Professor Andy on "The Bozo Super Sunday Show") to create music for TV and film. Their music has been featured on The Oprah Winfrey Show, The Dr. Oz Show, Nightline (U.S. news program) and many other nationally syndicated shows and public TV series. In 2008, they collaborated with photographer Arthur Durkee to create the Liquid Crystal Gallery series of video DVD meditations. In 2011, they launched a website of original music for commercial video production, http://www.perfectchoicemusic.com, which features searchable and downloadable music for TV, film, internet and corporate videos.

Jewer's other talents include audio engineering, music production, writing scores and charts, and audio mixing and mastering. He plays various instruments including classical flute, Native American flute, electronic woodwind, piano, synthesizer and bass guitar.

References

External links
Laughing Cat Records biography

Native American flute players
Year of birth missing (living people)
Living people